Pinghu railway station, formerly Ping Wu station, serves the town of Pinghu, Shenzhen, Guangdong, China. It is a stop on the Guangzhou–Shenzhen railway, and also the termini of Pinghu–Nanshan railway and Pinghu–Yantian railway.

History 
The station was opened in 1911 as part of the Kowloon–Canton Railway Chinese Section, with trains running between Kowloon and Canton.

Since the China Railway speed-up campaign, the number of passenger trains stopping at Pinghu was decreasing, and was totally closed to passenger service since 2006 where the last stopping passenger train was cancelled.

It reopened following refurbishment on 26 September 2016. It is an intermediate station exclusively for CRH intercity trains on the Guangzhou–Shenzhen railway, conventional trains do not stop at this station.

References 

Railway stations in Guangdong
Railway stations in Shenzhen
Railway stations in China opened in 1911
Stations on the Pinghu–Yantian Railway
Stations on the Pinghu–Nanshan Railway
Stations on the Beijing–Kowloon Railway
Stations on the Guangzhou–Shenzhen Railway